Urorcites cribripennis is a species of beetle in the family Cerambycidae, the only species in the genus Urorcites.

References

Elaphidiini